Tachhalā (Nepal Bhasa: तछला) is the eighth month in the Nepal Era calendar, the national lunar calendar of Nepal. The month coincides with Jyeshtha (ज्येष्ठ) in the Hindu lunar calendar and June in the Gregorian calendar.

Tachhalā begins with the new moon and the full moon falls on the 15th of the lunar month. The month is divided into the bright and dark fortnights which are known as Tachhalā Thwa (तछला थ्व) and Tachhalā Gā (तछला गा) respectively.

Among the major festivals observed during the month, the 6th day of the bright fortnight is Sithi Nakha which is dedicated to Kumar Kartikeya, one of the two sons of Hindu deity Shiva. The special food of the festival is "wo", a lentil cake. The holiday has an environmental aspect apart from its religious significance. On this day, water sources like wells, ponds and fountains are cleaned.

The full moon day of Gaidu Purnimā, known as Jyā Punhi in Nepal Bhasa, is a widely celebrated holiday. For Buddhists, Jya Punhi is sacred as the day when Prince Siddhartha, the Buddha-to-be, left his home in search of enlightenment.

The full moon day is also known as Panauti Punhi for the festival that takes place in Panauti, a town to the east of Kathmandu. During Panauti Jātrā, chariot processions of the deities Bhairava and Bhadrakali are held in the most important celebration here.

On the 8th day of the dark fortnight, the festival of Machā Tiyā Jātrā or Trishul Jātrā ("The Procession with the Trident") is held in Deopatan in Kathmandu.

Days in the month

Months of the year

References

Months
Nepali calendar
Nepalese culture